Apatania is a genus of caddisflies in the family Apataniidae. There are at least 90 described species in Apatania.

The type species for Apatania is Apatania wallengreni R. McLachlan.

Species

References

Further reading

 
 
 
 

Trichoptera genera
Integripalpia